is a Japanese manufacturer and distributor of tomato-based foods, and fruit and vegetable juices.

Its core product is the Yasai Seikatsu 100 brand of vegetable juice, introduced in 1995.  It also claims to be Japan's largest supplier of tomato ketchup and tomato juice.  Kagome grows tomatoes in greenhouses and market gardens in Japan.

Since 2007, it has partnered with Asahi Breweries to develop low alcohol fruit and vegetable drinks.  
U.S.-based global fast food restaurateur, Yum! Brands, awarded its 2008 Asia Franchise STAR to Kagome.

History

Ichitaro Kanie began cultivating tomatoes in 1899 — according to Kagome, these were the first grown in Japan. 
He soon began producing tomato ketchup and Worcester sauce.
However, tomato juice was not sold until 1933.   
The Kagome trademark was registered in 1917, and the Aichi Tomato Co., Ltd was incorporated in 1949.
In 1963, Aichi Tomato became Kagome Co., Ltd, and fifteen years later, gained a listing on the Tokyo Stock Exchange.

Beginning with the 1998 incorporation of a United States subsidiary, Kagome developed overseas, with subsidiaries and minority stakes in affiliates in Asia, North America and Europe, and a strategic alliance with the H. J. Heinz Company.
It also purchased a Japanese company specializing in vegetable lactic acid bacteria, Yukijirushi Labio Co., Ltd, now Kagome Labio Co., Ltd.

References

External links
 Kagome website (Japanese)
 Kagome English website
Kagome Foods India website

Japanese companies established in 1949
Food and drink companies established in 1949
Food and drink companies of Japan
Manufacturing companies based in Nagoya
Condiment companies
Companies listed on the Tokyo Stock Exchange
Japanese brands